TEB may refer to:

 Teterboro Airport, a general aviation airport in New Jersey, US
 Taxable equivalent basis, a banking term
 Terminal end bud, a structure of the mammary gland
 Third Eye Blind, an alternative rock band 
 The Easy Button, an alternative rock band
 Win32 Thread Information Block (also called the Thread Environment Block), a data structure used in Microsoft Windows
 Tønsberg–Eidsfoss Line, a railway in Norway
 Transit Explore Bus, a proposed straddling bus concept
 Triethylborane, a chemical used to ignite rocket motors and jet afterburners, and to initiate chemical reactions
 Türk Ekonomi Bankası, a Turkish bank
 Trophée Eric Bompard, a figure skating competition